The  is a limited express train service operated by West Japan Railway Company (JR West) in Japan.

Station stops
 -  -  -  - -  -  - 

The Maizuru 2 and 11 (coupling with the Kinosaki services between Kyoto and Ayabe) stop at Hiyoshi Station.

Rolling stock
Since the 12 March 2011 timetable revision, Maizuru services have been operated with 3-car 287 series electric multiple unit trains or 2-car Kitakinki Tango Railway KTR8000 series diesel multiple units, which operate coupled with Kinosaki or Hashidate sets between Kyoto and Ayabe. Green (first class) car accommodation is not available on Maizuru services.

Prior to 12 March 2011, services were operated using 3-car 183 series EMUs trains based at Fukuchiyama Depot. Trains operated coupled with 4-car Tamba sets between Kyoto and Ayabe.

History
The Maizuru service was introduced from 2 October 1999, following the completion of electrification of the Maizuru Line.

From 18 March 2007, all cars were made non-smoking.

See also
 List of named passenger trains of Japan

References

External links
 JR West 287 series Maizuru train information 
 JR West KTR8000 series Maizuru train information 

Named passenger trains of Japan
West Japan Railway Company
Railway services introduced in 1999
1999 establishments in Japan